Olivier Schmutz (born 12 February 1971) is a Swiss judoka.

Achievements

See also
Judo competitions in Switzerland
Swiss judoka

References

External links

Swiss male judoka
1971 births
Living people
Place of birth missing (living people)